Caryosyntrips ("nutcracker") is an extinct genus of radiodont which known from Canada, United States and Spain during the middle Cambrian. Caryosyntrips is known only from its 14-segmented frontal appendages, which resemble nutcrackers, recovered from the Burgess Shale Formation, Canada Wheeler Shale and Marjum Formation, United States, and Valdemiedes Formation, Spain. It was first named by Allison C. Daley, Graham E. Budd in 2010 and the type species is Caryosyntrips serratus. Caryosyntrips is thought to have used their appendages in a scissor-like grasping or slicing motion, and were probably durophagous, feeding on hard-shelled organisms. Due to the unusual morphology of the frontal appendages and the limited extent of known remains, its position within Radiodonta remains uncertain.

References

External links
 

Anomalocaridids
Burgess Shale fossils
Fossil taxa described in 2010
Cambrian genus extinctions